Myxexoristops is a genus of flies in the family Tachinidae.

Species
M. abietis Herting, 1964
M. arctica Zetterstedt, 1838
M. bicolor (Villeneuve, 1908)
M. blondeli (Robineau-Desvoidy, 1830)
M. bonsdorffi (Zetterstedt, 1859)
M. fronto (Coquillett, 1897)
M. hertingi Mesnil, 1955
M. neurotomae (Sellers, 1943)
M. stolida (Stein, 1924)

References

Exoristinae
Diptera of Europe
Diptera of Asia
Diptera of North America
Tachinidae genera
Taxa named by Charles Henry Tyler Townsend